Rafał Wilk (born 9 December 1974 in Łańcut) is a Paralympic handcyclist and former speedway rider from Poland.

Career
Wilk won two gold medals at the 2012 Summer Paralympics in London. Now he is a handcyclist but he used to be a professional speedway rider. He started doing sports in 1991, at the age of 12. On 3 May 2006, Rafal Wilk had an accident during a speedway meeting in Krosno. He injured his spinal cord, and lost control in the lower part of his body. After the accident, he was determined to continue as an athlete, so he took up monoski and went on to practice handbiking. He proved successful in the latter, shortly winning his first Polish championship title. In 2012, during the London Summer Paralympic Games he won two gold medals in road cycling in the H3 category (handbiking).

References

External links 
Rafał Wilk page

Paralympic cyclists of Poland
Paralympic gold medalists for Poland
Cyclists at the 2012 Summer Paralympics
1974 births
Polish speedway riders
People from Łańcut
Living people
Sportspeople from Podkarpackie Voivodeship
Medalists at the 2012 Summer Paralympics
Medalists at the 2016 Summer Paralympics
Paralympic medalists in cycling
21st-century Polish people